Frue Church or Hetland Church is a parish church of the Church of Norway in Stavanger Municipality in Rogaland county, Norway. It is located in the borough of Storhaug in the centre of the city of Stavanger. It is one of the two churches for the St. Johannes parish which is part of the Stavanger domprosti (arch-deanery) in the Diocese of Stavanger. The white, wooden church was built in the long church style in 1854 using designs by the architect Hans Hansen Kaas. The church seats about 700 people.

The church was originally built as the main church for the old municipality of Hetland and it was known as Hetland Church, but after it was merged into the city of Stavanger, the church has been officially known as Frue Church, however the old name is still in use.

See also
List of churches in Rogaland
Informationen zur Jehmlich Orgel in der Frue Kirke in Stavanger

References

Churches in Stavanger
Wooden churches in Norway
19th-century Church of Norway church buildings
Churches completed in 1854
1854 establishments in Norway